The Samsung E900, introduced in 2006, is a high-end mobile phone and is derived from Samsung's D500-D600-D800 series of slide phones. It is of a slide-up design and has touch-sensitive keys, similar to the LG Chocolate (KG800). It was one of the most popular phones at the time but was discontinued late 2007 when buyers then turned their attention to the Samsung D900i, followed by the Samsung U600, which was the slimmest phone by Samsung with a thickness of  until the E840 was released.

Specifications
The Samsung E900 contains many technologies that make it one of the most feature-rich phones available in the middle of 2006.

 2 Megapixel Camera (1600x1200)
 Video Recording CIF 352x288 & Messaging (MPEG4)
 Music Player (MP3, ACC/ACC+, e-AAC+, WMA formats)
 Bluetooth (with A2DP)/ USB
 Document Viewer for DOC XML and PPT files / TV-output
 Java games - 6 included on the phone but only 2 free
 Text/Photo/Video Caller ID/EMS
 Personal organiser functions
 Talktime: 3.5 hours
 Battery standby: 220 hours
 80MB built in memory
 Touch pad (capacitive touch sensitive)

This phone was the first phone released by Samsung with the new Black UI & White & White UI. This user interface was created to be more convenient and quickly learnable.

Phone contains Bluetooth, Java ME player and an MP4 and MP3 player.

References

External links
 Accessories, Samsung UK
 Product Manual
 Software
 CNet Review

E0900
Mobile phones introduced in 2006
Slider phones